Basilia may refer to:

 Basilia (fly), a genus of bat flies
 Basilia (island) or Baltia, in Greco-Roman geography, a mythic island in northern Europe
 Basilia (name), a feminine given name
 Basel (Latin: Basilia), a city in Switzerland

See also
 Basella, a genus of plants
 Basilea (disambiguation)
 Basilian (disambiguation)